The Mercedes-Benz Travego (also known as O580) is an integral coach produced since 1999 by Daimler/EvoBus in Neu-Ulm and Mannheim in Germany and since 2005 at Mercedes-Benz bus plant in Hoşdere, Istanbul, Turkey. It succeeded the O404 and was originally introduced as the flagship of Mercedes-Benz touring coach range.

First generation - 1999-2006
In year 1999, the O580 Travego 1st generation with all new exterior design succeeded the O404 in the segment of luxury touring coach flagship. It shares many of its components with Setra 400 TopClass Series. Three lengths were available for sale: O580-15 RHD with 2 axles in 12.2m, O580-16 RHD with 3 axles in 13m and O580-17 RHD in 14m. The 12m version was also available as O580-15 RH with lowered floor. Technical novelties include: All new driver seat with a joystick for shifting instead of traditional gearshift lever. One year after its introduction, the Travego received new assistance systems such as Adaptive Cruise Control (ART), Lane Assist (SPA), Continuous Brake Limiter (DBL), and Electronic Stability Program (ESP), which were available either as standard or as optional equipment.

Second generation - 2006-2017

Third generation - 2017-present 
The third generation of Travego was launched in 2017. Unlike previous generations, it is available only in Turkey, when this model is produced. Elsewhere, Travego was replaced by third generation of Mercedes-Benz Tourismo.

Gallery

References

External links

Travego
Vehicles introduced in 1999
Coaches (bus)